Joosep is an Estonian masculine given name, a version of Joseph.

People named Joosep include:
Joosep Matjus (born 1984), Estonian documentary filmmaker
Joosep Saat (1900–1977), Estonian communist politician, journalist and academic
Joosep Toome (born 1985), Estonian basketball player
Joosep Vau (born 1989), birth name of PK (musician), Estonian alternative new school hip-hop and Emo rap artist

Fictional characters
Joosep Toots, one of the main character from Oskar Luts's novels Kevade, Suvi and Sügis and their film adaptions (Spring).
Joosep Raak, the main character of the 2007 Estonian movie about school violence The Class, directed by Ilmar Raag

References

Estonian masculine given names